Sudhin Dasgupta (9 October 1929 – 10 January 1982) was a prolific Bengali music director, lyricist, and singer. He worked in various other Indian languages, such as Hindi, Assamese and Oriya. His contribution opened a new horizon to the Bengali music for both the arenas of Bengali basic song as well as Bengali film song.

Personal life
Born on 9 October 1929, Sudhindranath dasgupta, popularly known as Sudhin Dasgupta, was brought up at Darjeeling. The ancestral house of his family was in 'Kalia' village, Jessore District, Bangladesh. His father, Mahendranath Dasgupta was a teacher at Darjeeling Govt. School. His mother was a social activist in those days.

Sudhindranath, alias Sudhin Dasgupta, was proficient in music from his early years. He could play various types of musical instruments with equal expertise, such as Sitar, Sarod, Harmonium, Piano, Mandolin, Piklu, Guitar, Violin, Esraj etc., along with percussion such as Tabla and Drums. He graduated in music from Royal School of Music London.

Sudhin was also adept in playing various games. When he was in Calcutta (Kolkata) he was a member of the Hockey team in Bhabanipur Club.

It was 1949-50 when Sudhin and his family had to shift permanently to Calcutta (Kolkata), initially at Srinath Mukherjee Lane and then to the house at Sinthi. This was the time when he gradually delved into the world of Bengali modern music. Apart from working as music assistant to the legendary music director Kamal Dasgupta, he maintained his responsibility of creating songs for the Calcutta North Squad of IPTA (Indian Peoples Theatres' Association). And a day came when Sudhin met Khitish Basu of His Master's Voice (HMV) who gave him the opportunity to compose Bengali modern music. The first two modern songs composed by him was Kato Asha Kato Bhalobasha and Keno Akash Hote recorded by Bechu Dutta in 1953. Eventually the versatile musical journey of Sudhin Dasgupta began which was consistent until the last day of his life.

Sudhin Dasgupta was married to Smt. Majushree Dasgupta (Sengupta). Their son Soumya is an architect by profession, and daughter Saberi is a fashion designer.

Music
The years of the 1950s, 1960s, and 1970s are considered as the golden era for Bengali modern song as well as Bengali basic song. During this period, Bengali music was enriched by contributions of numerous music directors and lyricists such as Gouri Prasanna Majumdar, Pulak Bandyopadhyay, Shaymal Gupta, Mintu Ghosh, Pronob Roy, Robin Chattopadhya, Pabitra Chattopadhya, Anol Chattopadhya, Anupam Ghatak, Anil Bagchi, Jnan Prakash Ghosh, Salil Chowdhury, Nachiketa Ghosh, Hemanta Kumar Mukhopadhyay, Shyamal Mitra, Bhupen Hazarika and Sudhin Dasgupta. He was also known to be an excellent player of different Indian and Western musical instruments like Tabla, Sitar, Piano, Harmonium, Esraj, Violin and others.

Early years
Some time during early fifties, Sudhin Dasgupta was invited by Geeta Dutt and Guru Dutt to join their production house in Bombay (Mumbai). For some time Subir Sen and Sudhin Dasgupta stayed together in Tardeo Sonawala building in Mumbai when Sudhin composed a song "এত সুর আর এত গান" (Eto sur aar eto gaan), which was recorded by Subir Sen much later. By this time the second record of Subir Sen appeared in 1956 containing two compositions of Sudhin Dasgupta, 'ঐ উজ্জ্বল দিন ডাকে স্বপ্ন রঙ্গীন' and 'স্বর্ণঝরা সূর্যরঙে'.  These immortal creations made the Composer cum lyricist Sudhin Dasgupta famous and made a permanent place for him in the world of Bengali music.

Since his early years Sudhin Dasgupta was associated with the activities of IPTA (Indian People's Theatre Association), where his was befriended with many stalwarts of that time, such as Salil Chowdhury, Sourindra Mohan Sengupta, Ritwik Ghatak, Utpal Dutt, Khwaja Ahmad Abbas, Salil Chowdhury, Pandit Ravi Shankar, Jyotirindra Moitra, Debabrata Biswas and others. During this time Sudhin Dasgupta composed music for Thikana, a famous poem written by Sukanta Bhattacharya, which was sung at IPTA meetings by Sourindra Mohan during the Teachers' Movement in 1954. However, later another version of the song with music composed by Salil Choudhury was recorded and became very popular.

Sudhin had a professional voice too, and the lone record of his songs written by his close friend Subir Hazra was published in 1961 with two tracks: 'কোকিল কাঁদে কেন ফাগুনে’ based on folk tune, and 'লাল লাল চোখে দেখি একে ওকে’ with the tune of jazz.

Composer of Basic Songs
The first Bengali song recorded in Sudhin's composition were in Bechu Dutta's voice: 'কত আশা কত ভালোবাসা' and 'কেন আকাশ হতে' in 1953. In basic Bengali song, Sudhin Dasgupta gifted the audience a number of super-hit tracks, including "Ei Jhir Jhir Batase", "Bhanga Torir Sudhu E Gaan", "Ami Taar Thikana Rakhini", "Ekta Gaan Likho Amar Jonno", "Oi Ujjwalo Din", "Saat Ronga Ek Pakhi", "Akash Eto Meghla", "Naam Rekhechi Bonolata" and many others. Again, he contributed both as composer and lyricist in many of the items. He worked extensively with all the legendary singers like Hemanta Kumar Mukhopadhyay, Manna Dey, Dwijen Mukhopadhyay, Shyamal Mitra, Manabendra Mukhopadhyay, Satinath Mukhopadhyay, Sandhya Mukhopadhyay, Pratima Bandopadhyay, Arati Mukhopadhyay, Talat Mahmood, Lata Mangeshkar, Asha Bhonsle, Mohammed Rafi etc. In the year 1967 itself both Sudhin and Salil presented Puja Albums containing ten songs each, such was the popularity of the duo.

Composer/Music Director in Movies
In 1957, Sudhin Dasgupta entered the Bengali Film industry as the music composer for film called "Ulka".  His second film was "Dak Harkara" (1958), where famous Bengali novelist, Tarashankar Bandopadhyay contributed the lyrics. Sudhin never looked back and Bengali film industry got a series of mega hits from him like "Antaral", "Shankhabela", "Tin Bhuboner Pare", "Prothom Kodom Phul", "Chaddabeshi", "Picnic", "Har Mana Har", "Basanta Bilap", "Hangsaraj", "Amrito Kumbher Sondhane" and many more. In many of the films he acted both as the lyricist and the composer. He worked for around fifty Bengali films. While composing music for the film "Goli Theke Rajpoth" Sudhin inducted Manne Dey for the first time to make play back song in the lip of Uttam Kumar, in the song "লাগ লাগ লাগ ভেল্কির খেলা". The great trio, Sudhin Dasgupta, Uttam Kumar and Manna Dey produced several magical songs in films "Shankhabela", "Kokhono Megh", "Manjari Opera", "Chhadmabeshi", "Har Mana Har", "Raater Rajanigandha" etc. afterwards.

Experimentation
Sudhin Dasgupta experimented with different forms of music all through his musical career. He used Baul, South Indian Tunes, Folk, and Western Chorus in his various creations. Sometimes he adopted tune of various origin into his creations. In Shyamal Mitra's voice "Kato dur kato dur" he used the tune of "Jingle bells". One such song was "I come from Alabama" which inspired the Bengali song Oi meghe meghe, sang by Gayatri Basu in 1954. In the same year Sudhin composed Mor gaan shishirer khora sure go, sang by Sandhya Mukherjee, which could be inspired by Tchaikovsky's composition Danse Choinoise (1882), having a faint resemblance in the first line only. He created the song "হারিয়ে ফেলেছি মন জানি না তো কোথায় কখন" based on "Casanova".

Advertisement jingles
Sudhin Dasgupta also worked for commercial advertisement jingles. One such composition by Sudhin has become a legend: "Mathar Ghonochul Jokhon, Morubhumi Hoye Jai…”.

Music for Children
Bengali song has got a rich episode for the world of the kids and Sudhin Dasgupta contributed in that field too. He contributed to the music albums for the children, titled "Hingsute Doitto" and "Chotoder Ramayan".

He also composed music for many of the well-known Bengali poems from authors like Sunirmal Basu, Jogindranath Sarkar, Jatindranath Sengupta ('থই থই শাওন এল ওই' by Sandhya Mukherjee), Batakrishna Dey ('কৃষ্ণচূড়া আগুন তুমি’ by Geeta Dutt) and Jatindra Mohan Bagchi ('বাঁশবাগানের মাথার ওপর' by Pratima Bandopadhyay) etc.

Sudhin as a poet
Sudhin Dasgupta wrote lyrics for many songs. Immense popularity of these songs itself speak of the poetical values of these lyrics with their literary value. One of the first of his creations was the song he wrote for Subir Sen in 1954, Eto Sur Ar Eto Gaan, which had become a milestone in Bengali music world:  

Sudhin as a social worker and reformer
Sudhin Dasgupta actively responded through his pen to the distress of people in the time of partition in 1947 and afterwards. He created a few motivational songs during that time for the IPTA. During the Bangladesh war in 1971 too he created unforgettable songs paying homage to the birth of the New Nation and its founder Bangabandhu Sheikh Mujibur Rahman: Bangabandhu phire ele.

Bengali filmography
List of all Films for which Music or Lyrics were composed by Sudhin Dasgupta

Discography
List of all songs for which Music or Lyrics were composed by Sudhin Dasgupta
{| class="sortable wikitable"
|+ Sudhin Dasgupta Discography
|-
! width="5%" |Year
! width="20%" |Song
! width="15%" |Singer
! width="10%" |Language
! width="10%" |Film/album
! width="15%" |Lyrics
! width="15%" |Music
|-
| 19- || Anek durer pranto sheshe || Salil Mitra || Bengali || Akashvani Ramyageeti || Sudhin Dasgupta || Sudhin Dasgupta
|-
| - || Ashather chayatol || Sachin Gupta || Bengali ||  || Sailen Roy || Sudhin Dasgupta
|-
| 1961 || AaNdhar majhe tomar o rup || Lata Mangeskar || Bengali || Panka Tilak || - || Sudhin Dasgupta
|-
| 1976 || Aah ki jwala dyakh na sokhi || Arundhati Holme Choudhury || Bengali || - || Dinendra Choudhury || Sudhin Dasgupta
|-
| 1963 || Aaha mon kemon kemon || Satinath Bandopadhyay || Bengali || Puja Album || Sudhin Dasgupta || Sudhin Dasgupta
|-
| 1970 || Aaj holi khelbo Shyam || Sandhya Mukherjee || Bengali || Manjari Opera || - || Sudhin Dasgupta
|-
| 1966 || Aaj mon cheyechhe ami hariye jabo || Lata Mangeskar || Bengali || Shankhabela || - || Sudhin Dasgupta
|-
| 1967 || Aaj shudhu khela || Banasri Sengupta || Bengali || Puja Album || - || Sudhin Dasgupta
|-
| 1961 || Aajo mone pore baare baare || Hemanta Mukherjee || Bengali || Shilalipi || Subir Hazra || Sudhin Dasgupta
|-
| 1965 || Aakash jekhane galpo bale || Subir || Bengali || Puja Album || Sudhin Dasgupta || Sudhin Dasgupta
|-
| 1958 || Aakashe aaj ronger khelaa (first Bengali song by Asha Bhonsle) || Asha Bhonsle || Bengali || Puja Album || Sudhin Dasgupta || Sudhin Dasgupta
|-
| 19- || Aakashe takalam || Chorus || Bengali || Akashvani Ramyageeti || Sudhin Dasgupta || Sudhin Dasgupta
|-
| 19- || Aamar baaju bandher jhumko || Sandhya Mukherjee || Bengali || - || Tarashankar Bandyopadhyay || Sudhin Dasgupta
|-
| 1971 || Aamar din kate na || Asha Bhonsle || Bengali || Chadmabeshi || - || Sudhin Dasgupta
|-
| 1973 || Aami andhakaarer jatri || Asha Bhonsle || Bengali || Epar Opar || Sudhin Dasgupta || Sudhin Dasgupta
|-
| 1972 || Aami bhalo hote paari || Banasree Sengupta || Bengali || Puja Album || Sudhin Dasgupta || Sudhin Dasgupta
|-
| 1972 || Aami jeno tar-i alo || Arati Mukherjee || Bengali || Har mana har || Pulak Bandopadhyay || Sudhin Dasgupta
|-
| 1971 || Aami kon pothe je choli || Manna Dey || Bengali || Chadmabeshi || - || Sudhin Dasgupta
|-
| 1974 || Aami lukate parini || Sandhya Mukherjee || Bengali || - || Subir Hazra || Sudhin Dasgupta
|-
| 1973 || Aami Miss Calcutta 1976 ||  Arati Mukherjee || Bengali || Basanta Bilap || - || Sudhin Dasgupta
|-
| 1970 || Aami Shri Shri Bhajahari Manna || Manna Dey || Bengali || Prothom Kadam Phool || Pulak Bandopadhyay || Sudhin Dasgupta
|-
| 1968 || Aami taar thikana rakhini || Manna Dey || Bengali || Puja Album || Pulak Bandopadhyay || Sudhin Dasgupta
|-
| - || Aami toh haat bariyechhilam || Sujata Sarkar || Bengali || Puja Album || Dilip Ghosh || Sudhin Dasgupta
|-
| 1976 || Aami toh tomar chirodiner || Nirmala Mishra || Bengali || Puja Album || Babu Guhathakurta || Sudhin Dasgupta
|-
| 1971 || Aaro dure chalo jai || Asha Bhonsle || Bengali || Chadmabeshi || - || Sudhin Dasgupta
|-
| 19- || Aaro dure dure chalona ||Banashree Sengupta || Bengali || Akashvani Ramyageeti || Sudhin Dasgupta || Sudhin Dasgupta
|-
| 1966 || Aaro kato din ami khunjechhi tomake || Arati Mukherjee || Bengali || - || Sudhin Dasgupta || Sudhin Dasgupta
|-
| 1983 || Aaswine hok aghraane hok || Hementa Mukherjee || Bengali || Banasree || Pulak Bandopadhyay || Sudhin Dasgupta
|-
| - || Aaynate mukh dekhbo na || Arati Mukherjee || Bengali || - || Subir Hazra || Sudhin Dasgupta
|-
| 1971 || Banchao ke achho || Manna Dey || Bengali || Chadmabeshi || Subir Hazra || Sudhin Dasgupta
|-
| 1961 || Bandho chokhhe mor dao alo || Sabita Choudhury || Bengali || Pankatilak || Subir Hazra || Sudhin Dasgupta
|-
| 1971 || Banga Bandhu phire ele || Sandhya Mukherjee || Bengali || Poem converted to song || Abidur Rahaman || Sudhin Dasgupta
|-
| 1955 || Bansh baganer mathar opor || Pratima Bandopadhyay || Bengali || Poem converted to song || Jatindra Mohan Bagchi || Sudhin Dasgupta
|-
| 1972 || Banyo banyo e aranyo || Arati Mukherjee || Bengali || Puja Album || Sunil Baran || Sudhin Dasgupta
|-
| 1968|| Bhule jete tumi parbe ki || Ila Basu || Bengali || Puja Album || Sudhin Dasgupta  || Sudhin Dasgupta
|-
| 1956 || Bideshini kaader raani || Alpana Bandyopadhyay || Bengali || Puja Album || Bhaskar Basu || Sudhin Dasgupta
|-
| - || Bolte tumi paaro || Arati Mukherjee || Bengali || - || Sudhin Dasgupta || Sudhin Dasgupta
|-
| 1973 || Chalo aaj kichhu poth || Nirmala Mishra || Bengali || Puja Album || Barun Biswas || Sudhin Dasgupta
|-
| 1960 || Champa aamar ogo shono || Tarun Bandyopadhyay || Bengali || - || Salil Chowdhuri || Sudhin Dasgupta
|-
| 1957 || Champaar chokhe jeno kaar maya || - || Bengali || Ulka || Gauriprasanna Mazumder and Kanu Ranjan Ghosh || Sudhin Dasgupta
|-
| 1963 || ChaaNder aloy raater paakhi || Sailen Mukhopadhyay || Bengali || Puja album || Pulak Bandyopadhyay || Sudhin Dasgupta
|-
| 1962 || Chaar deyaler modhye nanan drishyo ke || Manna Dey || Bengali || Puja album || Sudhin Dasgupta || Sudhin Dasgupta
|-
| 1971 || Chho chho chho kya sharam ki baaNt || Ranjit Roy (comedian) || Bengali || Chadmabeshi || Sudhin Dasgupta || Sudhin Dasgupta
|-
| 1962 || China chena mukh || Dhananjoy Bhattacharya || Bengali || Puja album || Sunil Baran || Sudhin Dasgupta
|-
| 1971 || Chhi Chhi Chhi e ki kando || Banasree Sengupta || Bengali ||  || Barun Biswas || Sudhin Dasgupta
|-
| 1966 || Chinechhe chinechhi tomar e mon || Arati Mukherjee || Bengali || Puja Album || Sudhin Dasgupta || Sudhin Dasgupta
|-
| 1958 || Chokher najar || Shyamal Mitra || Bengali || Puja Album || Sudhin Dasgupta || Sudhin Dasgupta
|-
| 1969 || Deke deke chole gechhi || Asha Bhonsle || Bengali || Prothom Kadam Phool || Sudhin Dasgupta || Sudhin Dasgupta
|-
| 1973 || Dekheo je dekhe na || Arundhati Home Choudhury || Bengali || Puja Album || Sudhin Dasgupta || Sudhin Dasgupta
|-
| 1969 || Dibasa rajani jay jeno emoni || Satinath Mukhopadhay || Bengali || Puja Album || Sudhin Dasgupta || Sudhin Dasgupta
|-
| 1969 || Dure dure kachhe kachhe || Arati Mukherjee || Bengali || Teen Bhubaner Pare || - || Sudhin Dasgupta
|-
| 1961 || E amay kothay niye ele || Lata Mangeskar || Bengali || Pankatilak || Subir Hazra || Sudhin Dasgupta
|-
| 1972 || Ei akash natun bathash natun || Arati Mukherjee || Bengali || Har Mana Har || Pulak Bandopadhyay || Sudhin Dasgupta
|-
| 1958 || Ei chhaya bithi tole || Utpala Sen || Bengali ||  || Bhaskar Basu || Sudhin Dasgupta
|-
| 1950 || Ei chhaya ghera kalo raat || Dwijen Mukherjee || Bengali ||  || Sudhin Dasgupta || Sudhin Dasgupta
|-
| 1972 || Ei pothe pashapashi || Manna Dey, Krishna Bhanja || Bengali || Jaban || Sudhin Dasgupta || Sudhin Dasgupta
|-
| 1957 || Ei rat nijhhum || Nilima Bandyopadhyay || Bengali ||  || Sudhin Dasgupta || Sudhin Dasgupta
|-
| 1958 || Ei rim jhim jhim barosha || Talat Mahmood || Bengali ||  || Sudhin Dasgupta || Sudhin Dasgupta
|-
| 1970 || Ei shahar theke aro onek dure || Manna Dey || Bengali || Prothom Kadam Phool || Sudhin Dasgupta || Sudhin Dasgupta
|-
| 1967 || Ei shahare ei bandare || Shyamal Mitra || Bengali || Puja Album || - || Sudhin Dasgupta
|-
| 1973 || Ek choretei thanda ||  Arati Mukherjee || Bengali || Basanta Bilap || - || Sudhin Dasgupta
|-
| 1972 || Ek din dal bendhe || Manna Dey || Bengali || Picnic || - || Sudhin Dasgupta
|-
| 1970 || Ek din sei din || Banasree Sengupta || Bengali || Puja Album || Sudhin Dasgupta || Sudhin Dasgupta
|-
| 1962 || Ek jhhank pakhider mato || Manna Dey || Bengali || Puja album || Sudhin Dasgupta || Sudhin Dasgupta
|-
| 1959 || Ek-i onge eto rup || Manna Dey || Bengali || Puja album || Sudhin Dasgupta || Sudhin Dasgupta
|-
| 1962 || Ekta gaan likho aamar jonyo || Pratima Bandopadhyay || Bengali ||  || Subir Hazra || Sudhin Dasgupta
|-
| 1958 || Ektu chhNoya aar ektu paaoya || Geeta Dutt || Bengali ||  || Amitava Naha || Sudhin Dasgupta
|-
| 1964 || Elomelo haoyay hariye jete chay || Shyamal Mitra || Bengali || Tahole || Sudhin Dasgupta || Sudhin Dasgupta
|-
| 1964 || Emon madhur dhwani || Dhananjay Bhattacharya || Bengali || Puja Album || Sunil Baran || Sudhin Dasgupta
|-
| 1955 || Epaare Ganga opaare Ganga || Pratima Bandyopadhyay || Bengali || Akashvani Ramyageeti || Bhaskar Basu || Sudhin Dasgupta
|-
| 1972 || Esechhi Aladin || Manna Dey || Bengali || Puja Album || Sudhin Dasgupta || Sudhin Dasgupta
|-
| 1976 || Esona tomay kato misti kore || Sipra Bose || Bengali || Haar mana haar || Sudhin Dasgupta || Sudhin Dasgupta
|-
| 1967 || Eto kore kaachhe daaki || Banasri Sengupta || Bengali || Puja Album || - || Sudhin Dasgupta
|-
| 1957 || Eto sur aar eto gaan || Subir Sen || Bengali || Puja album || Sudhin Dasgupta || Sudhin Dasgupta
|-
| 1968 || Hariye jete jete || Arati Mukherjee || Bengali || Kakhono Megh || Sudhin Dasgupta || Sudhin Dasgupta
|-
| 19- || Hariye phelechhi mon || Mrinal Chakraborty || Bengali || Puja Album || Sudhin Dasgupta || Sudhin Dasgupta
|-
| 19- || Hira phele kaaNch || Banashree Sengupta || Bengali || - || Sudhin Dasgupta || Sudhin Dasgupta
|-
| 1969 || Hoyto tomari jonyo || Manna Dey || Bengali || Teen Bhubaner Pare || - || Sudhin Dasgupta
|-
| 19- || Ja re ja re barasare ||Sabita Chowdhury || Bengali ||  || Sudhin Dasgupta || Sudhin Dasgupta
|-
| 1957 || Jhiri jhiri chaitali batase || Geeta Dutt || Bengali || Puja Album || Sudhin Dasgupta || Sudhin Dasgupta
|-
| 1967 || Jhum jhumke naacho re || Manna Dey, Mrinal Chakraborty, Chorus || Hindi|| Abhisapta Chambal || Sudhin Dasgupta || Sudhin Dasgupta
|-
| 1967 || Jodi akash hoto ankhi || Arati Mukherjee || Bengali || Puja Album || Pulak Bandopadhyay || Sudhin Dasgupta
|-
| 1957 || Jodi e raate tumi thako sathe || - || Bengali || Ulka || Gauriprasanna Mazumder and Kanu Ranjan Ghosh || Sudhin Dasgupta
|-
| 1972 || Jpdi prtem kore tumi || Manna Dey || Bengali || Jaban || Sudhin Dasgupta || Sudhin Dasgupta
|-
| 1969 || Jibane ki pabona || Manna Dey || Bengali || Teen Bhubaner Pare || - || Sudhin Dasgupta
|-
| 1986 || Kabe tomay dekhechhi || Sujata Sarkar || Bengali || - || Pulak Bandopadhyay || Sudhin Dasgupta
|-
| 1953 || Kato asha kato bhalobasa  || Bechu Datta || Bengali || - || Arup Bhattacharya || Sudhin Dasgupta
|-
| 1967 || Katodin je khnuje gelam || Mrinal Chakraborty || Bengali || Puja Album || Sudhin Dasgupta || Sudhin Dasgupta
|-
| 1958 || Kaacher churir chhota || Geeta Dutt || Bengali || Dak Harkara || Tarashankar Bandopadhyay  || Sudhin Dasgupta
|-
| 1960|| Kaachhe ese chole jao || Ila Basu || Bengali || Puja Album || Sudhin Dasgupta  || Sudhin Dasgupta
|-
| 1956 || Kaajol kaajol kumkum || Geeta Dutt || Bengali || - || Miltoo Ghosh || Sudhin Dasgupta
|-
| 1970 || Kaajol lata sara janam || - || Bengali || Manjari Opera || Tarashankar Bandyppadhyay || Sudhin Dasgupta
|-
| 1974 || Kaal tahole ei samoyei || Shyamal Mitra || Bengali || Puja Album || Sudhin Dasgupta || Sudhin Dasgupta
|-
| 1968|| Kaane kane sei kothati || Ila Basu || Bengali || Puja Album || Sudhin Dasgupta  || Sudhin Dasgupta
|-
| 1961 || Kaar kotha bhebe bhebe  ||  || Bengali || Shila Lipi || - || Sudhin Dasgupta
|-
| 1958 || Kaar manjiro baaje || Shyamal Mitra || Bengali || Puja Album || Sudhin Dasgupta || Sudhin Dasgupta
|-
| 19- || Ke jeno aamar || Jatileswar Mukherjee || Bengali ||  || Subir Hazra || Sudhin Dasgupta
|-
| 1969 || Ke jeno duti haate || Pratima Bandyopadhyay || Bengali ||  || Barun Bswas || Sudhin Dasgupta
|-
| 1966 || Ke pratham kachhe esechhi || Lata Mangeskar & Manna Dey || Bengali || Shankhabela || - || Sudhin Dasgupta
|-
| 1959 || Ke go tumi dakle amare || Asha Bhonsle || Bengali || Goli Thekey Rajpath || Gauriprasanna Mazumder || Sudhin Dasgupta
|-
| 1969 || Ke tumi nandini || Manna Dey || Bengali || Teen Bhubaner Pare || - || Sudhin Dasgupta
|-
| 19- || Kemone taare daaki || Aati Mukherjee || Bengali || Akashvani Ramyageeti || Sudhin Dasgupta || Sudhin Dasgupta
|-
| 1953 || Keno akash hote  || Bechu Datta || Bengali || - || Arup Bhattacharya || Sudhin Dasgupta
|-
| 1967 || Keno daako isharay || Asha Bhonsle || Bengali || Abhisapta Chambal || Sudhin Dasgupta || Sudhin Dasgupta
|-
| 1965 || Keno tumi phire ele || Shyamal Mitra || Bengali || - || Sudhin Dasgupta || Sudhin Dasgupta
|-
| 1972 || Keno sarbonasher nesha || Asha Bhonsle || Bengali || Picnic || Pulak Bandopadhyay || Sudhin Dasgupta
|-
| 1965 || Ki bhalo laglo chokhe || Subir Sen || Bengali || Puja Album || Sunil Baran || Sudhin Dasgupta
|-
| 1961 || Ki jaadu jaane || Manna Dey, Geeta Dutt || Bengali || Pankatilak || - || Sudhin Dasgupta
|-
| 1967 || Ki naame deke || Shyamal Mitra || Bengali || Puja Album || Sudhin Dasgupta || Sudhin Dasgupta
|-
| 1955 || Klanti jodi naame || Supriti Ghosh || Bengali || Puja Album || Sudhin Dasgupta || Sudhin Dasgupta
|-
| 1961 || Kokil kande keno phagune || Sudhin Dasgupta || Bengali || Puja album || Subir Hazra || Sudhin Dasgupta
|-
| 1976 || Kolkata || Amit Kumar || Bengali || Hangsaraj || Pulak Bandopadhyay || Sudhin Dasgupta
|-
| 1969 || Kon se alor swapna niye || Asha Bhonsle || Bengali || Prothom Kadam Phool || Sudhin Dasgupta || Sudhin Dasgupta
|-
| - || Kono ek chena pothe || Arati Mukherjee || Bengali || Teen Bhubaner Pare || Pulak Bandopadhyay || Sudhin Dasgupta
|-
| 1959 || Laag laag velkir khela || Manna Dey || Bengali || Goli theke raajpoth || Gauriprasanna Mazumder || Sudhin Dasgupta
|-
| 1958 || Lal pagri bedhe mathe || Manna Dey || Bengali || Dak Harkara || Tarashankar Bandopadhyay || Sudhin Dasgupta
|-
| 1961 || Lal lal chokhe dekhi eke oke || Sudhin Dasgupta || Bengali || Puja album || Subir Hazra || Sudhin Dasgupta
|-
| 1972 || Lekha porata shikey tule || Manna Dey || Bengali || Har mana har || Pulak Bandopadhyay || Sudhin Dasgupta
|-
| - || Lolite aagei jodi || Arati Mukherjee || Bengali || - || Sudhin Dasgupta || Sudhin Dasgupta
|-
| 1970 || Maron tomar haar holo je || Manna Dey || Bengali || Manjari Opera || Tarashankar Bandyppadhyay || Sudhin Dasgupta
|-
| 1959 || Meghla meye megheri saaj porechhe || Manna Dey || Bengali || Puja album || Sudhin Dasgupta || Sudhin Dasgupta
|-
| 19- || Mon jodi hoy kaNcher ghor' || Banashree Sengupta || Bengali || - || Sudhin Dasgupta || Sudhin Dasgupta
|-
| 1972 || Mon metechhe mon mayurir || Asha Bonsle || Bengali || Picnic || Sudhin Dasgupta || Sudhin Dasgupta
|-
| 1958 || Mon re amar hay shunli na || Manna Dey || Bengali || Dak Harkara || Tarashankar Bandopadhyay || Sudhin Dasgupta
|-
| 1954 || Mor gaan shishirer khora sure go || Sandhya Mukherjee || Bengali || Puja Album || Sailen Roy || Sudhin Dasgupta
|-
| 1967 || Na bole esechhi ta bole || Arati Mukherjee || Bengali || Puja Album || Pulak Bandopadhyay || Sudhin Dasgupta
|-
| 1958 || Naach mayuri naach re (first Bengali song by Asha Bhonsle) || Asha Bonsle || Bengali || Puja Album || Sudhin Dasgupta || Sudhin Dasgupta
|-
| 1973 || Nao tumi jake ami khunjechhi || Manna Dey || Bengali || Rater Rajanigandha || - || Sudhin Dasgupta
|-
| 1967 || Naam rekhechhi banolata || Shyamal Mitra || Bengali ||  || Sudhin Dasgupta|| Sudhin Dasgupta
|-
| 1958 || Neel akasher oi kole || Shayamal Mitra || Bengali || I956-57 || Sudhin Dasgupta || Sudhin Dasgupta
|-
| 1972 || Neel kagoje bujhina keno || Banasree Sangupta || Bengali ||  || Sunil Baran || Sudhin Dasgupta
|-
| 1960 || Neel Neel Neel || Hemanta Mukherjee || Bengali || - || Premendra Mitra || Sudhin Dasgupta
|-
| 1963 || Neer bhenge jay jaak || Robin Bandyopadhyay || Bengali ||  || Sudhin Dasgupta|| Sudhin Dasgupta
|-
| 1955 || Nirjhorini jhirjhiriye || Supriti Ghosh || Bengali ||  || Paresh Dhar || Sudhin Dasgupta
|-
| 1957 || O amar mayur ponkhi nao || - || Bengali || Ulka || Gauriprasanna Mazumder and Kanu Ranjan Ghosh || Sudhin Dasgupta
|-
| 1976 || O babumoshai || Arati Mukherjee || Bengali || Hangsaraaj || Pulak Bandopadhyay || Sudhin Dasgupta
|-
| - || O chokhe amay dekona || Arati Mukherjee || Bengali || - || Sudhin Dasgupta || Sudhin Dasgupta
|-
| 1975 || O didimoni || Arati Mukherjee || Bengali || Hangsaraaj || Pulak Bandopadhyay || Sudhin Dasgupta
|-
| 1973 || O shyam jakhon takhon || Arati Mukherjee & Sujata Mukherjee || Bengali || Basanta Bilap || - || Sudhin Dasgupta
|-
| 1961 || Ore baba baro baro || Manna Dey || Bengali || Pankatilak || - || Sudhin Dasgupta
|-
| 19- || Ogo bihanga || Sandhya Mukherjee || Bengali || - || Sudhin Dasgupta || Sudhin Dasgupta
|-
| 1955 || Ogo Sucharita || Dhananjay Bhattacharya || Bengali || - || Sudhin Dasgupta || Sudhin Dasgupta
|-
| 1958 || Ogo tomar shesh bicharer ashay || Manna Dey || Bengali || Dak Harkara || Tarashankar Bandopadhyay || Sudhin Dasgupta
|-
| 1954 || Oi meghe meghe || Gayatri Basu || Bengali ||  || Sudhin Dasgupta || Sudhin Dasgupta
|-
| 1957 || Oi ujjwalo din || Subir Sen || Bengali ||  || Sudhin Dasgupta || Sudhin Dasgupta
|-
| 1961 || Ore baba baro baro chokhhe ||  || Bengali || Pankatilak || - || Sudhin Dasgupta
|-
| 1956 || Otho otho Ma Gouri || Geeta Dutt || Bengali || - || Bhaskar Basu || Sudhin Dasgupta
|-
| - || Path nirjon chalona ekhon || Mrinal Chakraborty || Bengali || - || Sudhin Dasgupta || Sudhin Dasgupta
|-
| - || Paushali sondhya ghoom ghoom tandra || Alpana Banerjee || Bengali || - || Sudhin Dasgupta || Sudhin Dasgupta
|-
| 1968 || Paye paye hridoyer || Salil Mitra || Bengali || Akashvani Ramyageeti || Sudhin Dasgupta || Sudhin Dasgupta
|-
| 1972 || Paye paye joriye rakho || Manna Dey || Bengali || Har mana har || - || Sudhin Dasgupta
|-
| - || Phul jaage na jaage na || Shyamal Mitra || Bengali || Puja Album || Sudhin Dasgupta || Sudhin Dasgupta
|-
| 1958 || Phuler bone laglo je dol || Geeta Dutt || Bengali || Puja Album || Sudhin Dasgupta || Sudhin Dasgupta
|-
| 1955 || Phuler mato jiban || Tarun Bandopadhyay || Bengali || Puja Album || Sudhin Dasgupta || Sudhin Dasgupta
|-
| 1974 || Prem kora je eki || Shyamal Mitra || Bengali || Puja Album || Sudhin Dasgupta || Sudhin Dasgupta
|-
| 1972 || Raat ekhono anek baaki || Asha Bhonsle || Bengali || Jiban Saikate || Sudhin Dasgupta || Sudhin Dasgupta
|-
| - || Raatri je jay swapno phuray || Sachin Gupta || Bengali ||  || Sailen Roy || Sudhin Dasgupta
|-
| 1957 || Rumjhum jhum jhum || Sandhya Mukherjee || Bengali || Puja Album || Sudhin Dasgupta || Sudhin Dasgupta
|-
| 1958 || Rup sagore dub || Hemanta Mukherjee || Bengali ||  || Gauriprasanna Mazumder || Sudhin Dasgupta
|-
| 1961 || Rupali chaNd jhile jhilimili || Sandhya Mukherjee || Bengali ||  || Sudhin Dasgupta || Sudhin Dasgupta
|-
| 1955 || Rupkathi gnaye shyamoli meyeti || Tarun Bandopadhyay || Bengali || Puja Album || Bahskar Basu || Sudhin Dasgupta
|-
| 1975 || Sahartar ei golok dhaNdhay || Arati Mukherjee || Bengali || Hangsaraaj || Pulak Bandopadhyay || Sudhin Dasgupta
|-
| 1963 || Saheli rup dekhali || Sailen Mukhopadhyay || Bengali || Puja album || Pulak Bandyopadhyay || Sudhin Dasgupta
|-
| 1970 || Sajani go rajanike || Pratima Bandopadhyay || Bengali || Puja Album || Miltu Ghosh || Sudhin Dasgupta
|-
| 1972 || Samay kakhan je || Hemanta Mukherjee || Bengali || Puja Album || - || Sudhin Dasgupta
|-
| 1955 || Sandhya bela nil akasher || Tarun Bandyopadhyay || Bengali || Shajarur Kanta || Sudhin Dasgupta || Sudhin Dasgupta
|-
| 1967 || Saiya ja re jar || Asha Bhonsle || Bengali || Abhisapta Chambal || Sudhin Dasgupta || Sudhin Dasgupta
|-
| 1972 || Saagar daake ay || Asha Bhonsle || Bengali || Jiban Saikate || Sudhin Dasgupta || Sudhin Dasgupta
|-
| 1957 || Saagar theke phera || Hemanta Mukherjee || Bengali || Poem converted to song || Premendra Mitra || Sudhin Dasgupta
|-
| 1962 || Saagare tumi jaar || Satinath Mukherjee || Bengali || - || Pabitra Mitra || Sudhin Dasgupta
|-
| 19- || Se chhilo aamar || Jatileswar Mukherjee || Bengali || - || Ajay Bhattacharya || Sudhin Dasgupta
|-
| 1977 || Shono bose chupchap || Manna Dey || Bengali || Hingsute Daityo || Bhaskar Bosu || Sudhin Dasgupta
|-
| 1983 || Shudhu ekti premer gaane || Arati Mukherjee || Bengali || Banasree || Pulak Bandopadhyay || Sudhin Dasgupta
|-
| 19- || Sonar haate sonar kakon || Satinath Mukherjee || Bengali || - || Bhaskar Basu || Sudhin Dasgupta
|-
| 1957 || Swarno jhora suryo ronge || Subir Sen || Bengali ||  || Sudhin Dasgupta || Sudhin Dasgupta
|-
| 1962 || Tapur tupur sara dupur || Arati Mukherjee || Bengali || - || Sunil Baran || Sudhin Dasgupta
|-
| 1962 || Tar churite je rekhechhi || Manabendra Mukherjee || Bengali || - || Sudhin Dasgupta || Sudhin Dasgupta
|-
| 1969 || Tere liye aya hain le ke koi dil || Geeta Dutt || Hindi || Goli theke raajpoth || Gauriprasanna Mazumder || Sudhin Dasgupta
|-
| 19- || Tomar amar thikana Padma Meghna Jamuna || Chorus || Bengali || - || Shibdas Bandyopadhyay || Sudhin Dasgupta
|-
| 1972 || Tomar deher bhongima ti || Manna Dey || Bengali || Har mana har || - || Sudhin Dasgupta
|-
| 1967 || Tomar deoya aungurio || Pratima Bandopadhyay || Bengali || Puja Album || Miltu Ghosh || Sudhin Dasgupta
|-
| 1965|| Tomar samaadhi phule phule dhaka || Shyamal Mitra || Bengali || Antaraal || Sunil Baran || Sudhin Dasgupta
|-
| 1958 || Tomare parini je bhulite || Talat Mahmood || Bengali ||  || Sudhin Dasgupta || Sudhin Dasgupta
|-
| 1957 || Tomare peyechhi bole || Shyamal Mitra || Bengali || N82743 || Sudhin Dasgupta || Sudhin Dasgupta
|-
| 1971 || Tomaye ekta rumal jakhon || Pintu Bhattacharya || Bengali || Puja Album || Barun Biswas || Sudhin Dasgupta
|-
| 1981 || Tomay dekhe chhobi eNke || Arati Mukherjee || Bengali || Kakhono Megh || Sudhin Dasgupta || Sudhin Dasgupta
|-
| 1975 || Tiya tiya tiya || Shyamasree Mazumder || Bengali || Hangsaraaj || Pulak Bandopadhyay || Sudhin Dasgupta
|-
| 1965 || Tumi chole jabar por || Shyaml Mitra || Bengali || Puja Album || Sunil Baran || Sudhin Dasgupta
|-
| 1963 || Tumi ele chmpa phutechhe tai || Mrinal Chakraborty || Bengali || Puja Album || Sudhin Dasgupta || Prasanta Choudhury
|-
| 1967 || Tumi je asha nodi || Mrinal Chakraborty || Bengali || Puja Album || - || Sudhin Dasgupta
|-
| 1971 || Tumi nirjon upokule || Pintu Bhattacharya || Bengali || Puja Album || Barun Biswas || Sudhin Dasgupta
|-
| 19- || Utho utho maa Gauri || Geeta Dutt || Bengali || Puja Album || Bhaskar Basu || Sudhin Dasgupta
|-
|}

Memoirs
Manna Dey recalled his first meeting with Sudhin Dasgupta during 1959, which was published in the book, Sudhin Dasgupta - A Collection of Music Essays. During those days Manne Dey was heavily engaged in Bombay (Mumbai) Film Industry. He came down from Bombay (Mumbai) and met Sudhin for his first record in Sudhin Dasgupta's composition that contained two songs (Ek-i onge eto rup and Meghla meye megher-i) released by HMV as Puja Album in 1959. Sudhin made another daring experiment for which Bengal will be ever thankful to him. He inducted playback voice of Manna Dey in the lip of the legendary hero Uttam Kumar in the movie "Goli theke raajpoth" in 1959, which was never thought of before. After this successful pairing became a super hit, Manne Dey sang many famous songs in the lip of Uttam Kumar in later years. However, it was again in 1966 Manna Dey got a proposal from Sudhin Dasgupta to sing for Uttam Kumar in the Bengali film Sankyabela. "I am eternally indebted to Sudhinda for the song 'Ke Prothom Kachhe Esechhi' which started my career in Bengali films", said Manna Dey in an interview..
Dwijem Mukhopadhyay recalled that he was introduced to Sudhin Dasgupta in 1954 by Kshitish Basu of HMV. Sudhin composed two songs for him. The record has two tracks: 'ভাঙা তরীর শুধু এ গান' and 'এই ছায়া ঘেরা কালো রাতে'. Later, when Salil Chowdhury was composing songs for Madhumati in Bombay, he requested Sudhin to lend him the tune of "Ei chaya Ghera Kalo Raate" for his new song of Madhumati. Sudhin gladly agreed, and a memorable song was created: "Suhana Safar Yieh Mousam Hain Haseen". Such was the friendship between Salil and Sudhin, as remembered by Dwijen Mukhopadhyay in his memoirs.
Arun Kumar Basu, who used pseudo name Bhaskar Basu while writing and publishing lyrics of Bengali modern songs, placed Sudhin Dasgupta as one of the noted lyricists of Bengali modern songs, in his memoirs on Sudhin. The poems written by Sudhin Dasgupta could be described as the epitome of imagery poems, rich in its form, content, mood and rhythm.
Jatileswar Mukherjee recalled his frequent visits to the house of Sudhin Dasgupta at D Gupta Lane, SiNthi, on most of the Sundays during the 1960s. Regular visitors of these Majlis were Jatileswar Mukherjee, Sukumar Mitra, Ashok Roy, Debdulal Bandyopadhyay, Ashishtaru Mukherjee, Sunil Baran, Prashanta Choudhury and Parimal Dasgupta (alias Polu, Sudhin's younger brother), among others.
Salil Mitra, younger brother of Shyamal Mitra, vividly described various incidents showing the deep friendship between contemporary artists of that time, such as Sudhin, Shyamal, Manabendra, Subir Hazra etc., in his reminiscence. One such incident occurred on the day of the marriage of Sudhin Dasgupta with Manjushree. Lyricist Subir Hazra went to the marriage venue at Paikpara in Shyamal Mitra's car. On the way coming back after attending the party, Subir asked Shyamal to stop the car near Wellington square. After a while when Subir did not return, Shyamal got off his car and went in search of Subir, only to find him writing a song sitting on a bench in the park. The subject of the song was the newly-wed bride, Manjushree and her glamorous dress for wedding. Next day both friends went to Sudhin's house, and after the music was composed by Sudhin, a great song was recorded by Shyamal Mitra: লাল চেলি পরনে কার (Laal cheli parone kaar'').

Awards
Bengal Film Journalists' Association Awards for best Best Music Director for the film Picnic (1972)

Legacy
Rabindra Bharati University paid homage to this him by creating an archive, where life and works of three legenderay personalities of Bengal would be portrayed which includes Soumitra Chatterjee, Salil Chowdhury and him.

References

External links

1929 births
1982 deaths
Indian male musicians
20th-century Indian musicians
20th-century male musicians
Musicians from Kolkata
Bengali musicians